The Wrong... is an American thriller television thriller film series starring and produced by Vivica A. Fox for Lifetime. The series was produced by Hybrid Films, and directed by David DeCoteau. More than 25 movies were produced between 2016 and 2021. Some of the other notable actors in the series include Jason-Shane Scott, Jessica Morris, Tracy Nelson and Eric Roberts.

Films
All films in the series have been directed by David DeCoteau.

The Wrong Neighbor, starring Michael Madsen, Andrea Bogart, Steve Richard Harris, Cristine Prosperi and Ashlynn Yennie, and which premiered on Lifetime on June 26, 2017, was also produced by Hybrid Films, but was directed by Sam Irvin and does not feature Viviva A. Fox. Other Lifetime films titled "The Wrong..." were not produced by Hybrid Films and are not part of this film series, and have often been retitled by Lifetime for broadcast.

References

American film series
American thriller films
Canadian television films
Lifetime (TV network) films
Films about stalking